290 (two hundred [and] ninety) is the natural number following 289 and preceding 291.

In mathematics
The product of three primes, 290 is a sphenic number, and the sum of four consecutive primes (67 + 71 + 73 + 79). The sum of the squares of the divisors of 17 is 290.

Not only is it a nontotient and a noncototient, it is also an untouchable number.

290 is the 16th member of the Mian–Chowla sequence; it can not be obtained as the sum of any two previous terms in the sequence.

See also the Bhargava–Hanke 290 theorem.

Integers from 291 to 299

291
291 = 3·97, a semiprime, floor(3^14/2^14) .

292
292 = 22·73, a noncototient, untouchable number.

293
293 is prime, Sophie Germain prime, Chen prime, Irregular prime, Eisenstein prime with no imaginary part, and a strictly non-palindromic number.

294
294 = 2·3·72, the number of rooted trees with 28 vertices in which vertices at the same level have the same degree .

295
295 = 5·59, a centered tetrahedral number

296
296 = 23·37, a refactorable number, unique period in base 2, the number of regions formed by drawing the line segments connecting any two of the 12 perimeter points of an 2 times 4 grid of squares (illustration) , and the number of surface points on a 83 cube.

297
297 = 33·11, the number of integer partitions of 17, a decagonal number, and a Kaprekar number

298
298 = 2·149, is nontotient, noncototient, and the number of polynomial symmetric functions of matrix of order 6 under separate row and column permutations

299
299 = 13·23, a highly cototient number, a self number, and the twelfth cake number

References 

Integers